Dragon Wagon was a roller coaster at the Indiana Beach amusement park.  

It opened in 2014 and was the first at the park since Little Dipper which closed in 1970.  It was part of four ride additions at the park which included Rock 'n' Tug, Growler, and Baby Baron. It was located in the Kiddyland section of the park. It only was open for four years. The coaster is one of many Wisdom Rides dragon wagon models.

History
In early 2014, Indiana Beach announced on its Facebook page of a seven ride addition for the 2014 season. One of the new attractions was announced as a kiddie coaster titled "Dragon Wagon".  This came after the announcement that the park's oldest operating coaster, Galaxi, would be closing after 42 seasons. 

All of the attractions opened for the season as planned, except for the Dragon Wagon roller coaster, which was postponed due to a number of delays while constructing. By late August 2014, construction ended and the ride opened with only a few seasonal operating days left. Dragon Wagon closed after the 2018 season.

References

Roller coasters in Indiana
Steel roller coasters
Roller coasters introduced in 2014
Roller coasters manufactured by Wisdom Rides